The Designated Approving Authority, in the United States Department of Defense, is the official with the authority to formally assume responsibility for operating a system at an acceptable level of risk. The new official term that has replaced DAA is Authorizing Official (AO).

Definition
This position is defined by the Department of Defense Directive 8500.1 (Information Assurance) - E2.1.13. Designated Approving Authority (DAA).

As an example.  The National Security Agency (NSA) may recommend to a unified command to operate at a certain classification range; e.g. U.S. Special Operations Command or U.S. Central Command.  The Command-in-Chief of the unified command (CENTCOM or SOCOM) would be the DAA, giving him/her the ability to override NSA recommendations.

Synonyms
This term is synonymous with "Designated Accrediting Authority" and "Delegated Accrediting Authority".

United States Department of Defense information technology